Deepak Gohain (born 11 December 1992) is an Indian cricketer. He is a slow left-arm orthodox bowler. He made his first-class debut for Assam in the 2011–12 Ranji Trophy on 29 November 2011 against Jharkhand at Dhanbad.

References

External links
 

1992 births
Living people
Indian cricketers
Assam cricketers